The Dry is an Irish comedy-drama television series created by Nancy Harris and produced by Element Pictures.  It stars Roisin Gallagher, Siobhán Cullen,Moe Dunford and Ciarán Hinds. The series premiered as a BritBox original on 5 May 2022.

Plot
Shiv Sheridan (Gallagher), a woman recovering from alcoholism, returns home to Dublin to face a family who are not terribly supportive of her sobriety.

Cast

Main
 Roisin Gallagher as Shiv Sheridan
 Siobhán Cullen as Caroline Sheridan
 Pom Boyd as Bernie Sheridan
 Moe Dunford as Jack
 Adam Richardson as Ant Sheridan
 Eoin Duffy as Rory
 Ciarán Hinds as Tom Sheridan

Recurring
 Emmanuel Okoye as Max
 Janet Moran as Karen
 Hélène Patarot as Mina 
 Dagmar Döring as Kristen
 Stephen Hogan as Dan
 Barry Barnes as Simon

Production
Harris was inspired to develop the series back in 2016, given her sense of being estranged from her Irish identity. The series was in development from Element for RTÉ One in 2020, and it was confirmed that December that the project would receive funding from the Broadcasting Authority of Ireland. In August 2021, it was announced BritBox UK had commissioned The Dry from Element in association with Screen Ireland, ITV Studios, and RTÉ. Harris is executive producing the series alongside Emma Norton, Michael Dawson, Ed Guiney, and Andrew Lowe of Element.

Alongside the commission came the casting announcement; Roisin Gallagher would lead the series with Ciarán Hinds, Siobhán Cullen, Moe Dunford, Adam J. Richardson, and Pom Boyd rounding out the cast.

Principal photography began in August 2021.

Episodes

References

External links
 

2022 Irish television series debuts
Irish drama television series
Irish comedy television series
BritBox original programming
RTÉ original programming
Television shows set in the Republic of Ireland
Works about alcoholism